The Warren Cove Range Lights are a set of range lights on Rocky Point, Prince Edward Island, Canada. They were built in 1907, and are still active.

Keepers
 Alexander S. McNeil 1907–1912 
 C. E. H. Newson 1912–1921 
 J. L. Doiron 1921–1923 
 James H. Feehan 1923–1931 
 Herbert Grovette 1931–1936 
 Maurice F. White 1936–1956 
 Harold MacKinnon 1956–1957

See also
 List of lighthouses in Prince Edward Island
 List of lighthouses in Canada

References

External links
Picture of Warren Cove Range Lights Lighthouse Friends
 Aids to Navigation Canadian Coast Guard

Lighthouses completed in 1907
Lighthouses in Prince Edward Island
Buildings and structures in Queens County, Prince Edward Island